The 2021 Turkish Grand Prix (officially known as the Formula 1 Rolex Turkish Grand Prix 2021) was a Formula One motor race, held on 10 October 2021 at Istanbul Park in Tuzla, Istanbul. It was the sixteenth of twenty-two rounds of the 2021 Formula One World Championship. This was also the last Turkish Grand Prix, as the race had not been contracted for the  season and beyond.

Lewis Hamilton, driving for Mercedes set the fastest lap time in qualifying but started 11th after the application of grid penalties. This promoted team-mate Valtteri Bottas to pole position. Bottas won the race, with the fastest lap, with Red Bull drivers Max Verstappen and Sergio Pérez finishing second and third.

Background 

The event took place from 8–10 October at Istanbul Park in Tuzla, Istanbul, with the race covering fifty-eight laps of the fourteen-turn circuit. It was the ninth running of the Turkish Grand Prix, all of which have taken place at the same venue. It had previously been scheduled for 11–13 June (replacing the cancelled Canadian Grand Prix), but was postponed due to unfavourable quarantine requirements during the COVID-19 pandemic in Turkey and the travel restrictions from Turkey imposed by the British government. On 25 June, the event was readded to the schedule following the cancellation of the Singapore Grand Prix, which was scheduled for 1–3 October. On 28 August, it was pushed back one week to 8–10 October due to the reduction of the number of Grands Prix into the calendar. This was the second consecutive year in which the Turkish Grand Prix had appeared on the calendar as a replacement round.

While the 2020 Turkish Grand Prix had been held behind closed doors, the 2021 edition was to have spectators in attendance. The track surface was water-blasted after the smooth tarmac provided little grip at the previous year's event. Charles Leclerc said he hoped the track surface would still be slippery to boost Ferrari's hopes of a good result at this race. Three previous Turkish Grand Prix winners entered this event in the form of Lewis Hamilton (who won the event twice previously in 2010 and 2020), Sebastian Vettel (who won the 2011 event), and Kimi Räikkönen (who won the inaugural Turkish Grand Prix in 2005).

Ten constructors entered two drivers each for the race, with no changes from the regular season entry list. The title sponsor of the Ferrari Team, Mission Winnow, was banned for this race. Red Bull and AlphaTauri both ran tribute liveries to Honda, their engine supplier, on what was due to be Honda's home race, the Japanese Grand Prix. The Red Bull cars ran with a predominantly white livery, inspired by the livery with which Honda won their first Formula One World Championship race, the 1965 Mexican Grand Prix. The AlphaTauri cars featured arigato, a Japanese word for "Thank you".

Sole Formula One tyre-supplier Pirelli supplied their middle range of compounds in terms of hardness (the C2, C3, and C4). Following the first two practice sessions, Pirelli's Formula One boss Mario Isola stated that their tyre selection was "too aggressive". Isola stated that this was because Pirelli had only learned that the track was to be water-blasted after they had made their tyre choices.

Going into the event, Hamilton held a two-point lead over Max Verstappen in the Drivers' Championship standings, with third-placed Valtteri Bottas twelve points ahead of fourth-placed Lando Norris and thirty-one ahead of fifth-placed Sergio Pérez. Mercedes led Red Bull Racing by thirty-three points in the Constructors' Championship standings. Five drivers including Hamilton also tried out a prototype glove design in the first practice session, designed to improve safety by preventing burns similar to those suffered by Romain Grosjean at the 2020 Bahrain Grand Prix.

Free practice 
A trio of free practice sessions took place on Friday and Saturday, each an hour in length. Lewis Hamilton set the fastest time of the first free practice session for Mercedes ahead of Red Bull driver Max Verstappen and Ferrari's Charles Leclerc. Hamilton was fastest for the second praction session ahead of Leclerc and Hamilton's team-mate Valtteri Bottas. Whilst the first two practice sessions were held in dry conditions, the third one was held in the wet and ended with AlphaTauri Pierre Gasly fastest ahead of Verstappen and Verstappen's team-mate Sergio Pérez. The first two practice sessions ran without major incident, whilst the third one was briefly red flagged after Williams driver George Russell beached his car in the gravel.

Qualifying 
The qualifying practice session started at 15:00 local time (UTC+03:00) on the Saturday. Hamilton set the fastest time, with Bottas second, Verstappen set the third fastest time, with Leclerc fourth fastest in the session for Ferrari. Hamilton was penalised 10 places for a new ICE unit, which meant that Bottas would take pole position. Sainz had extra power unit components installed which meant that he would start the race in last position no matter where he qualified.

Schumacher qualified in to the second part of qualifying for the second time in his Formula One career and Tsunoda reached the third part for the first time since the 2021 Austrian Grand Prix. This pole was Bottas's 18th in Formula One, with his last one being at the Portuguese Grand Prix in May.

Qualifying classification

Notes 
  – Lewis Hamilton received a ten-place grid penalty for exceeding his quota of internal combustion engines.
  – Carlos Sainz Jr. was required to start the race from the back of the grid for exceeding his quota of power unit elements.
  – Daniel Ricciardo was required to start the race from the back of the grid for exceeding his quota of power unit elements.

Race 
The race started at 15:00 local time (UTC+03:00) on the Sunday. Ferrari and McLaren replaced the hybrid systems on Sainz's and Ricciardo's cars, respectively, which resulted in them starting from the back of the grid. Hamilton also received a ten-place grid penalty for exceeding his number of permitted internal combustion engines.

On the first lap, Fernando Alonso and Pierre Gasly made contact at the first corner, with Gasly receiving a five-second penalty. Alonso later made contact with Mick Schumacher, with Alonso receiving the same penalty. After passing Vettel, Hamilton got past Yuki Tsunoda after the latter defended the position until Hamilton passed on the eighth lap. On the fourteenth lap, Carlos Sainz Jr. dived down the inside of Vettel at the eleventh turn, but he had to go on the inside kerb to stay on the race track in the damp conditions. This upset the car and Sainz hit Vettel's front left tyre. Sainz made multiple overtakes in the opening phase of the race, progressing from his nineteenth-place starting position to ninth by lap eighteen.

Bottas won the race ahead of Verstappen. Verstappen retook the lead in the  standings from Hamilton, who finished fifth after a late pit stop. Ocon finished the race in tenth place after not making any pit stops, losing forty-eight seconds to Sainz over the last ten laps. Ocon was the first driver to complete a full race distance without making a pit stop in twenty-four years since Mika Salo at the 1997 Monaco Grand Prix. There were no retirements.

Post-race 
Martin Brundle believed that Hamilton should take responsibility for his initial pit strategy saying he should have respected the initial instructions to pit. 2009 World Champion Jenson Button, who was commentating on the race, also stated he felt Hamilton only pitted at all because he was unaware he would lose track positions after his stop. Gasly said following the race the drivers would intend to speak with race director following controversy over recent stewards decisions, with Gasly penalised in the race for his first lap contact with Alonso and the decision not to penalise Alonso for improving his laptime in Saturday qualifying under double waved yellows. In light of the Alonso qualifying incident, Masi said the sport would "quite possibly" adopt a system from the following race onwards whereby any lap completed under double waved yellows would automatically be deleted. Alonso apologised to Schumacher over the collision on the opening lap of the race. Verstappen felt Mercedes had stepped up their performance significantly compared to previous races during the weekend. Christian Horner was surprised by Mercedes's recent improvement in straightline speed. Both Lando Norris and Yuki Tsunoda complained of having their visibibility hindered by "dirty spray" (surface water mixed with oil, dust, and dirt), with the latter feeling it contributed to a spin which he believed lost him a points-scoring position. Masi said he had not heard complaints from other drivers and never believed the conditions in Turkey were bad enough to warrant suspending the race.

Race classification

Notes 
  – Includes one point for fastest lap.

Championship standings after the race

Drivers' Championship standings

Constructors' Championship standings

 Note: Only the top five positions are included for both sets of standings.

Notes

References

External links 

Turkish Grand Prix
Turkish Grand Prix
Turkish
Turkish Grand Prix
Turkish Grand Prix